Cally Air is a Nigerian airline owned by the Cross River State Government.

History
The airline commenced operations on 16 July 2021, when a Boeing 737 aircraft was welcomed on touchdown by Benedict Ayade, who boarded the aircraft for inspection and lauded the event as the realisation of a dream that had started in 2017.

Destinations
As of May 2022, Cally Air flies to the following destinations in Nigeria.

Fleet
As of May 2022, Cally Air has the following fleet.

See also
 Ibom Air
 Aero Contractors (Nigeria)

References 

Airlines of Nigeria
2017 establishments in Nigeria